Jeufosse is a former commune in the Yvelines department in the Île-de-France region in north-central France. On 1 January 2019, it was merged into the new commune Notre-Dame-de-la-Mer.

See also
Communes of the Yvelines department

References

Former communes of Yvelines
Populated places disestablished in 2019